was a political doctrine in the Empire of Japan that stated that Southeast Asia and the Pacific Islands were Japan's sphere of interest and that their potential value to the Empire for economic and territorial expansion was greater than elsewhere.

After military setbacks at Nomonhan, Mongolia; the start of the Second Sino-Japanese War; and negative Western attitudes towards Japanese expansionist tendencies, the Southern Expansion Doctrine became predominant. Its focus was to procure colonial resources in Southeast Asia and to neutralize the threat posed by Western military forces in the Pacific. The Army favored a "counterclockwise strike" while the Navy favored a "clockwise strike."

Meiji-period genesis
In Japanese historiography, the term nanshin-ron is used to describe Japanese writings on the importance to Japan of the South Seas region in the Pacific Ocean. Japanese interest in Southeast Asia can be observed in writings of the Edo period (17th–19th centuries).

During the final years of the Edo period, the leaders of the Meiji Restoration determined that Japan needed to pursue a course of imperialism in emulation of the European nations to attain equality in status with the West, as European powers were laying claim to territories ever closer to Japan.

After the Meiji Restoration of 1868, the nanshin-ron policy came to be advanced with the southern regions as a focus for trade and emigration. During the early Meiji period, Japan derived economic benefits from Japanese emigrants to Southeast Asia, among them, there were prostitutes (Karayuki-san) who worked in brothels in British Malaya, Singapore, the Philippines, the Dutch East Indies and French Indochina. Nanshin-ron was advocated as a national policy by a group of Japanese ideologues during the 1880s and the 1890s. Writings of the time often presented areas of Micronesia and Southeast Asia as uninhabited or uncivilised and suitable for Japanese colonisation and cultivation. In its initial stages Nanshin-ron focused primarily on Southeast Asia, and until the late 1920s, it concentrated on gradual and peaceful Japanese advances into the region to address what the Japanese saw as the twin problems of underdevelopment and Western colonialism. During the first decade of the 20th century, private Japanese companies became active in trade in Southeast Asia. Communities of emigrant Japanese merchants arose in many areas and sold sundry goods to local customers, and Japanese imports of rubber and hemp increased. Large-scale Japanese investment occurred especially in rubber, copra, and hemp plantations in Malaya and in Mindanao in the southern Philippines. The Japanese Foreign Ministry established consulates in Manila (1888), Singapore (1889), and Batavia (1909).

With increasing Japanese industrialization came the realization that Japan was dependent on the supply of many raw materials from overseas locations outside its direct control and was hence vulnerable to that supply's disruption. The Japanese need for the promotion of trade, developing and protecting sea routes, and official encouragement of emigration to ease overpopulation arose simultaneously with the strengthening of the Imperial Japanese Navy, which gave Japan the military strength to protect its overseas interests if diplomacy failed.

Pacific islands
The Japanese government began pursuing a policy of overseas migration in the late 19th century as a result of Japan's limited resources and increasing population. In 1875, Japan declared its control over the Bonin Islands. The formal annexation and incorporation of the Bonin Islands and Taiwan into the Japanese Empire can be viewed as first steps in implementation of the "Southern Expansion Doctrine" in concrete terms.

However, World War I had a profound impact on the "Southern Expansion Doctrine" since Japan occupied vast areas in the Pacific that had been controlled by the German Empire: the Caroline Islands, Mariana Islands, Marshall Islands and Palau. In 1919, the island groups officially became a League of Nations mandate of Japan and came under the administration of the Imperial Japanese Navy. The focus of the "Southern Expansion Doctrine" expanded to include the island groups (the South Seas Mandate), whose economic and military development came to be viewed as essential to Japan's security.

Theoretical development
Meiji-period nationalistic researchers and writers pointed to Japan's relations with the Pacific region from the 17th-century red seal ship trading voyages, and Japanese immigration and settlement in Nihonmachi during the period before the Tokugawa shogunate's national seclusion policies. Some researchers attempted to find archeological or anthropological evidence of a racial link between the Japanese of southern Kyūshū (the Kumaso) and the peoples of the Pacific islands.

Nanshin-ron appeared in Japanese political discourse around the mid-1880s. In the late 19th century, the policy focused on the adjacent China with an emphasis on securing control of Korea and expanding Japanese interests in Fujian. Russian involvement in Manchuria at the turn of the century led to the policy being eclipsed by hokushin-ron (the "Northern Expansion Doctrine"). The resulting Russo-Japanese War (1904–05) produced territorial gains for Japan in South Manchuria. After the war, the expansionist aspects of nanshin-ron became more developed, and the policy was incorporated into national defence strategy in 1907.

In the 1920s and the 1930s, the "Southern Expansion Doctrine" gradually came to be formalized, largely through the efforts of the Imperial Japanese Navy's "South Strike Group," a strategic think tank based in the Taihoku Imperial University in Taiwan. Many professors at the university were either active or former Navy officers, with direct experience in the territories in question. The university published numerous reports promoting the advantages of investment and settlement in the territories under Navy control.

In the Navy, the Anti-Treaty Faction (han-joyaku ha) opposed the Washington Treaty, unlike the Treaty Faction. The former set up a "Study Committee for Policies towards the South Seas" (Tai Nan'yō Hōsaku Kenkyū-kai) to explore military and economic expansion strategies, and cooperated with the Ministry of Colonial Affairs (Takumu-sho) to emphasize the military role of Taiwan and Micronesia as advanced bases for further southern expansion.

Economic development
In 1920 the Foreign Ministry convened the Nan-yo Boeki Kaigi (South Seas Trade Conference), to promote South Seas commerce and published in 1928 Boeki, Kigyo oyobi imin yori mitaru Nan'yo ("The South Seas in View of Trade and Emigration"). The term Nan-yo kokusaku (National Policy towards the South Seas) first appeared.

The Japanese government sponsored several companies, including the Nan'yō Takushoku Kabushiki Kaisha (South Seas Colonization Company), the Nan'yō Kōhatsu Kabushiki Kaisha (South Seas Development Company), and the Nan'yō Kyōkai (South Seas Society) with a mixture of private and government funds for development of phosphate mining, sugarcane and coconut industries in islands and to sponsor emigrants. Japanese Societies were established in Rabaul, New Caledonia, Fiji and New Hebrides in 1932 and in Tonga in 1935.

The success of the Navy in the economic development of Taiwan and the South Seas Mandate through alliances among military officers, bureaucrats, capitalists, and right-wing and left-wing intellectuals contrasted sharply with Army failures in the Chinese mainland.

Increasing militarization
The Washington Naval Treaty had restricted the size of the Japanese Navy and also stipulated that new military bases and fortifications could not be established in overseas territories or colonies. However, in the 1920s, Japan had already begun the secret construction of fortifications in Palau, Tinian and Saipan.

To evade monitoring by the Western powers, they were camouflaged as places to dry fishing nets or coconut, rice, or sugar-cane farms, and Nan'yō Kohatsu Kaisha (South Seas Development Company) in co-operation with the Japanese Navy, assumed responsibility for construction.

The construction increased after the even more restrictive London Naval Treaty of 1930, and the growing importance of military aviation led Japan to view Micronesia to be of strategic importance as a chain of "unsinkable aircraft carriers" protecting Japan and as a base of operations for operations in south-west Pacific.

The Navy also began examining the strategic importance of Papua and New Guinea to Australia since it was aware that the Australian annexation of those territories had been motivated in large part in an attempt to secure an important defense line.

Adoption as national policy
In 1931, the "Five Ministers Meeting" defined the Japanese objective of extending its influence in the Pacific but excluded areas such as the Philippines, the Dutch East Indies and Java, which might provoke other countries. Nanshin-ron became official policy after 1935 and was officially adopted as national policy with the promulgation of the Toa shin Chitsujo (New Order in East Asia) in 1936 at the "Five Ministers Conference" (attended by the Prime Minister, Foreign Minister, Finance Minister, Army Minister and the Navy Minister), with the resolution to advance south peacefully.

By the start of World War II, the policy had evolved in scope to include Southeast Asia. The doctrine also formed part of the basis of the Greater East Asian Co-Prosperity Sphere, which was proclaimed by Japanese Prime Minister Konoe Fumimaro from July 1940. Resource-rich areas of Southeast Asia were earmarked to provide raw materials for Japan's industry, and the Pacific Ocean was to become a "Japanese lake." In September 1940, Japan occupied northern French Indochina, and in November, the Pacific Islands Bureau (Nan'yō Kyoku) was established by the Foreign Ministry. The events of the Pacific War from December 1941 overshadowed further development of the "Southern Expansion Doctrine", but the Greater East Asia Ministry was created in November 1942, and a Greater East Asia Conference was held in Tokyo in 1943. During the war, the bulk of Japan's diplomatic efforts remained directed at Southeast Asia. The "Southern Expansion Doctrine" was brought to an end by the Japanese surrender at the end of the war.

See also
 Axis power negotiations on the division of Asia
 Flying geese paradigm
 German-Japanese relations
 Pan-Asianism
 Southern Expeditionary Army Group

References

Bibliography
 
 
 
 

Foreign relations of the Empire of Japan
Military history of Japan
Japanese colonial empire
19th-century military history of Japan
20th-century military history of Japan